The 1973 New England Patriots season was the franchise's 4th season in the National Football League and 14th overall. The patriots ended the season with a record of five wins and nine losses and a third place finish in the AFC East Division. It was the first year under head coach and general manager Chuck Fairbanks, hired in January after six seasons as head coach of the Oklahoma Sooners.

Selections in the 1973 NFL Draft included John Hannah, Sam Cunningham, Ray Hamilton, and Darryl Stingley. The assistant coaches on offense included future NFL head coaches Ron Erhardt, Sam Rutigliano,
and Red Miller.

Offseason

NFL Draft

Staff

Roster

Regular season

Schedule 

Note: Intra-division opponents are in bold text.

Standings

References 

New England Patriots
New England Patriots seasons
New England Patriots
Sports competitions in Foxborough, Massachusetts